Xao "Jerry" Yang (born 1967) is an ethnic Hmong poker player from Temecula, California and the 2007 World Series of Poker Main Event champion.

Yang started playing poker in 2005.  An amateur player at the time, Yang entered the 2007 World Series of Poker after winning a $225 satellite at the Pechanga Resort and Casino in Temecula. Prior to the World Series, he had four cashes in local California events. At the final table, Yang went from starting eighth in chips to holding a big chip lead that he never relinquished. The process of accumulating this chip lead involved Yang knocking out seven of the eight other players at the final table.

After a 12-hour final table, Yang won $8,250,000 for the victory. As he did with other players at the final table, he proceeded to inform Lam that he had a "friend for life". As of 2014, the majority of his live tournament winnings, $8,437,435, resulted from his win at the 2007 Main Event.

Yang summarized his tournament strategy: "I study my opponents very carefully, and when I sensed something, when I sensed some weakness, I took a chance.  Even if I had nothing, I decided to raise, reraise, push all-in or make a call....The only way that I could win this tournament was by being aggressive from the very beginning and that’s exactly what I did.  And thank God I was also able to pick up some good cards at the same time." Once Yang was guaranteed a share of the prize money, he pledged to donate 10% of his winnings to three charities (the Make-a-Wish Foundation, Feed The Children, and the Ronald McDonald House), as well as his alma mater, Loma Linda University.

As of 2016, Yang's live tournament winnings exceed $8,400,000.

Personal life
Yang, an ethnic Hmong, was born in Laos.  When the communists took over in the 1970s, his family escaped to Thailand where they spent four years in a refugee camp. While living in the camp, a brother and sister of his died.

Yang currently lives in Madera, California. Yang holds a master's degree in health psychology from Loma Linda University and worked as a psychotherapist and social worker.

He is married and has six children.

References

External links
 Official site
 Worldseriesofpoker.com profile
 Full Tilt Poker profile

1967 births
Living people
American people of Hmong descent
American people of Laotian descent
American poker players
American social workers
People from Temecula, California
World Series of Poker bracelet winners
World Series of Poker Main Event winners
American people of Chinese descent